Philadelphia Firebirds may refer to:
Philadelphia Firebirds (ice hockey), a team which played in the North American Hockey League and later the American Hockey League from 1974 to 1979
Philadelphia Firebirds (IWFL), a women's American football team currently playing in the Independent Women's Football League